Hangju Hwang clan is a Korean clan. Their Bon-gwan is in Hangzhou, Zhejiang, China. , there was 402 members of this clan. He was naturalized in Joseon, ruled by Crown Prince Sohyeon in 1645. 's descendants settled in Gapyeong County, Gyeonggi Province and made Hangzhou their Bon-gwan, founding the Hangju Hwang clan.

See also 
 Korean clan names of foreign origin

References

External links 
 

Hwang clans
Korean clan names of Chinese origin